The Ongoing History of New Music is the longest running music history documentary radio program in Canada.  produced by Corus Entertainment and hosted by Alan Cross. It is syndicated to several radio stations, mostly but not exclusively Corus-owned, across Canada.

The Ongoing History chronicles the history of alternative rock, from its roots in punk and new wave to the modern day. An episode of the show may profile an important musician or band, a significant musical trend such as grunge or Madchester, or a theme such as payola, gay musicians or significant cult figures.
Some topics are covered in a single show, while more substantial topics may be presented over multiple episodes.

History 
In early 1993, Alan Cross was tasked by management at CFNY-FM to create a weekly documentary that would place this new alt-rock into context for their listeners.  The show aired it's first episode on February 28, 1993.  It would go on to air 691 episodes before Alan Cross was dismissed from the company in 2011.

The show went into hiatus with no new shows being produced until Alan was rehired by CNFY in 2014. 

In February 2023, the show celebrated 30  years since it first aired in  Toronto.

Reoccurring yearly Episodes
 Starting in 2015, a yearly episode called 60 Mind-Blowing Facts in 60 Minutes become a regular feature in which Alan covers all the tiny, but interesting facts he has come across in the last 12 months but there isn't enough to build a whole show around.
 Every year on the last Sunday before Christmas the annual Xmas Show airs. This is a showcase of Alt-Rock Christmas music, with much of it having been released in the last calendar year. This episode always ends with Twas The Night Before Christmas recited by Henry Rollins.

Other Media
The shows format and name can be found on a series of 4 compilation CDs,  and 4 audiobooks.

References

External links
 Ongoing History of New Music on 102.1 the edge (CFNY) web site
 The Ongoing History of New Music Minute (Podcast) in the iTunes Store

Canadian music radio programs
Rock music radio programs
Syndicated Canadian radio programs
Music_history
 -